Wolfgang Kreissl-Dörfler (born 1 December 1950 in Augsburg) is a German politician who served as a Member of the European Parliament from 1994 until 2014. He is a member of the Social Democratic Party of Germany, part of the Socialist Group.

During his time in parliament, Kreissl-Dörfler sat on the European Parliament's Committee on Foreign Affairs. He was also a substitute for the Committee on Civil Liberties, Justice and Home Affairs and a member of the Delegation for relations with the United States.

Education
 Farmer and qualified social science teacher
 Civilian service at accident hospital in Murnau

Career
 1979-1985: Development aid worker with the German Development Service in Brazil
 1986-1987: expert with the German World Hunger Relief Agency in Angola
 in Germany
 leader of a project for unemployed young people
 senior teacher at a rehabilitation centre for people with severe physical disabilities and respiratory problems
 leader of a public project working with children and young people
 1994-2014: Member of the European Parliament
 Member of North-South Forum, Munich
 Member of WEED (World Economy, Ecology and Development)
 Member of Europa Union
 Member of AbL, e.V (German Small Farmers' Association)
 1992: UN election observer in Angola
 2000: election observer in Mexico
 2001: Head of Mission/ Chief European Union Observer for elections in East Timor
 2002: honorary citizen of the City of Massapé, north-east Brazil

External links
 
 
 

1950 births
Living people
Social Democratic Party of Germany MEPs
MEPs for Germany 1994–1999
MEPs for Germany 1999–2004
MEPs for Germany 2004–2009
MEPs for Germany 2009–2014